Chotisüh Sazo is a politician from Nagaland, India. He is a member of LJP . In 2008 he was elected to the Nagaland Legislative Assembly  as an Independent candidate and was appointed Parliamentary secretary for Social Welfare and Women Development.

In 2013 Sazo was elected as Speaker of Nagaland Legislative Assembly. Sazo is also a former Cabinet Minister for PHE Nagaland.

In 2013 and 2018 Sazo was elected as Naga People's Front candidate in Chozuba constituency (ST) and won.

In the 2008, as an Independent he won the seat against Thenucho of NPF. Sazo got 8754 votes.

References 

Nagaland MLAs 2008–2013
Naga People's Front politicians
1962 births
Living people
People from Kohima
Speakers of the Nagaland Legislative Assembly
Nagaland politicians
Nagaland MLAs 2013–2018